Rumble and Sway is the second EP by Jamie N Commons. The title song was used in the trailer for the 2016 Coen brothers film, Hail, Caesar!, season 3 of American supernatural teen drama television series Teen Wolf, season 3 of American legal drama television series Suits and the movie Monster Trucks (film) as well as making appearances in commercials for Levi's in 2014 and for Butterfinger in 2020. Steve Leggett writes in his AllMusic review that "Commons is on his way somewhere, and if Rumble and Sway feels like a transitional affair, it also feels like a good transition, pointing to the possibility of a masterpiece just around the bend."

Track listing

Musicians
Jamie N Commons: Guitar, Vocals, Percussion, Background Vocals
C.C. Adcock: Guitar
Rhiannon Armstrong: Violin
Gillian Bradtke: Violin
J Browz: Guitar
Ben Castle: Baritone Saxophone, Tenor Saxophone
Jon Cleary: Piano
Nicole Robson: Cello
Eg White: Drums, Guitar, Producer, Synthesizer, Background Vocals
Gus Collins: Percussion, Piano, Background Vocals
George Cook: Drums, Percussion, Background Vocals
James Dee: Bass, Background Vocals
Jonno Frishberg: Fiddle
Susie Gillis: Double Bass, Violin
Mike Glozier: Drums
Charlie Stock: Viola
M.J. Nunez: Slide Guitar
Chris Storr: Trumpet
Ed Harcourt: Pump Organ, Background Vocals
Kid Harpoon: Background Vocals
Benjamin Markham: Guitar, Percussion, Background Vocals
Jolynda Robinson: Background Vocals
Yolanda Robinson: Background Vocals

Production
Alex da Kid: Producer, Executive Producer
Mark Bishop: Engineer
Jamie N Commons: Producer, Engineer
Jayson DeZuzio: Producer
Steve Gullick: Photography
Ed Harcourt: Producer
Eliot James: Producer, Engineer, Mixing
Joe LaPorta: Mastering
Darren Lawson: Engineer
Benjamin Markham: Producer
Josh Mosser: Engineer
Hugh Worskett: Mixing, Producer
Eg White: Engineer
Manny Marroquin: Mixing
Steve Stacey: Art Direction, Design

All track information and credits were taken from the CD liner notes.

References

External links
Jamie N Commons Official Site
Interscope Records Official Site

Jamie N Commons albums
2013 EPs
Interscope Records EPs